Sidewinder 1 is a 1977 American action film directed by Earl Bellamy and written by Nancy Voyles Crawford and Thomas A. McMahon. The film stars Marjoe Gortner, Michael Parks, Susan Howard, Alex Cord, Charlotte Rae and Barry Livingston. The film was released on September 21, 1977, by AVCO Embassy Pictures.

Plot
Aging motorcycle racer J.W. Wyatt is approached by rich industrialist and racing enthusiast Packard Gentry to endorse his own custom-designed cycle, the Sidewinder 1. Wyatt brings in a team, including young and reckless Digger, to test and augment the prototype bike. When Gentry dies in a motocross accident, Wyatt must persuade Gentry's unenthusiastic and corporate-minded sister Chris to continue backing the project.

Cast     
Marjoe Gortner as Digger
Michael Parks as J.W. Wyatt
Susan Howard as Chris Gentry
Alex Cord as Packard Gentry
Charlotte Rae as Mrs. Holt
Barry Livingston as Willie Holt
Bill Vint as Jerry Fleming
Byron Morrow as Gentry Executive

References

External links
 
 

1977 films
1977 action films
American action films
American auto racing films
Motorcycle racing films
Films directed by Earl Bellamy
Embassy Pictures films
1970s English-language films
1970s American films